The Democratic Party of Serbs in Macedonia (DPSM; , Demokratska partija Srba u Makedoniji; , Demokratska partija na Srbite vo Makedonija; abbr. ДПСМ, DPSM) is a political party representing the interests of Serbs in North Macedonia as well as other political, social and economic issues.

Overview 

At the last legislative elections, April 2014, the party won one out of 120 seats.

DPSM's elected Parliamentary Deputy is Ivan Stoilković who is the current President of the DPSM.

Goals 

The party goals may be defined as: preservation and advancement of Serbs and their respective culture and heritage by legal implementation and practical projects and support for the development of North Macedonia as a multiethnic, free-market orientated democracy. It has traditional base of members and supporters in the regions of Skopska Crna Gora inhabited by Serbs, among Serbs in the cities of Skopje and Kumanovo and among other minor communities of Serbs in other areas of North Macedonia.

From the inception of political pluralism in the Republic of Macedonia, it is by far the most representative political option for Serbs in this state and since the 2001 change of party leadership, its preferred political partner is VMRO-DPMNE, current leader of parliamentary position.

See also 
Serbs of North Macedonia

External links
Official site of the DPSM
DPSM's 2005 Political Platform (-pdf, zipped, in Serbian)

Conservative parties in North Macedonia
Serb political parties in North Macedonia
Serbs of North Macedonia